Postal is an isometric top-down shooter video game developed by Running with Scissors and published by Ripcord Games in 1997. A sequel to the game, Postal 2, was released in 2003. Two additional sequels, Postal III and Postal 4: No Regerts, were released in 2011 and 2022, respectively. Director Uwe Boll bought the movie rights for the series and produced a film of the same name. A March 2001 re-release of the game, called Postal Plus, included a "Special Delivery" add-on. A remake of the game, Postal Redux, was released for Microsoft Windows on May 20, 2016, and was later released for the PlayStation 4 and Nintendo Switch digital stores. At the end of 2016, the game's source code was released under the GNU GPL-2.0-only. At the end of 2019, Running With Scissors released the game as freeware.

Gameplay 
Postal is a 3D shooter with mainly isometric, but also some top-down levels featuring hand-painted backgrounds. Gameplay and interface are similar to first-person shooters of the time in most, but not on all counts:

Movement is always relative to the orientation of the player character (named "The Postal Dude"). The player, therefore, must always be aware of the direction the character is facing, which can be difficult to some players on the isometric maps.
There are eight weapon slots, each with a fixed amount of maximum ammo. The default weapon is a weak machine gun with unlimited ammo. Although it serves no practical purpose, the player can conceal their weapons by pressing the tilde key.
Contrary to first-person shooters, however, the goal is not to stay alive and just reach the next level, but to kill a given percentage of the armed NPCs on the map. Only then the exit to the next level is activated. Even if the player is dead, they may still exit the level as long as the required number of hostiles have been killed.

Plot 
A man referred to simply as the "Postal Dude" has been evicted from his home. He believes the United States Air Force is releasing an airborne agent upon his town of Paradise and that he is the only individual unaffected by the ensuing "hate plague". He fights his way from his house to an Air Force Base through various locations, including a ghetto, train station, trailer park, truck stop, and an ostrich farm. During the course of the gameplay, a voice in the protagonist's head (voiced by Rick Hunter) can be heard taunting his victims through cryptic absurdity, often through consecutive kills or when switching through the player's arsenal.

After raiding the Air Force Base, he is shown attempting to massacre an elementary school. Despite his best efforts, his weapons have no effect on the children. Suffering a mental breakdown amidst innocent laughter, he finds himself restrained in a mental asylum as hellish images cover the screen: A body bound to chains in a corridor, the protagonist in a straitjacket curled in the fetal position; a close-up of his face (albeit covered by bindings) and the door to his cell numbered 593. A disembodied voice, possibly a psychologist, gives a report on the protagonist's mental state: He suggests that the stress of urban life may have been the root cause of his rampage, prompting him to "go postal". The lack of any mentions of military interference with the civilian population strongly implies that the Postal Dude's murders were the result of his own paranoid delusions. Amid distorted audio, the psychologist gives a final remark: "We may never know exactly what set him off, but rest assured we will have plenty of time to study him". Upon completion of the credits, manic cackling can be heard as the screen fades to black. It is suggested that the protagonist may have escaped the confines of the asylum to pursue further acts of violence.

Due to the controversy surrounding the game's release, along with numerous, unrelated American school shootings in the years following, the 2016 redux of the game's ending has been changed. Replacing the elementary school vision is the player witnessing the burial of an unknown person in a decaying field, though it can be implied that it is his own. Completion of the game on the hardest difficulty features the inclusion of an unknown male and female mourning over the grave as it descends. Both outcomes prompt a similar mental breakdown and an identical asylum cutscene, though consisting of animated shots over the original release's still image artwork.

History

Development 
Postal was developed by Running with Scissors and published by Ripcord Games in 1997 for Windows and MacOS.

Releases 
Postal: Special Delivery, an expansion to the original Postal, was released on August 28, 1998 and featured four new levels and various new characters and voices. One level, in particular, was set in a parody of Wal-Mart and began with the Dude's demon chastising the store for not selling Postal, which foreshadows the off-kilter humor seen in Postal 2.

In 2000 a Japanese version of Postal called Super Postal was released featuring Japanese voices and two exclusive levels, "Tokyo" and "Osaka". These levels remained exclusive to Super Postal until the release of Postal Redux in 2016.

A March 2001 re-release of the game, called Postal Plus, included the "Special Delivery" add-on. It was ported to Linux by Loki Entertainment in the same year.

In 2002, Postal Plus (known as Postal: Classic and Uncut in Europe) bundled Postal and the Special Delivery expansion, with retail copies also including a demo for Postal 2.

Postal Plus was released on the digital distributor GOG.com in 2009 and a few years later on Steam. In 2013, it was updated with support for widescreen resolutions and modern hardware. The multiplayer component and level editor were removed, however. In 2015, it was updated with full Xbox 360 controller support.

In 2015, the developers announced that they will release the source code of the game "if someone promises to port it to the Dreamcast". In June 2016 the developers gave the source code to a community developer who ported the game to Linux for the OpenPandora handheld. On December 28, 2016, the source code was released on Bitbucket under the GNU GPL-2.0-only.

On February 14, 2022, independent publisher Wave Game Studios announced a port of the game to the Sega Dreamcast was to be released on June 2, officially licensed by Running with Scissors.

Reception 

NPD Techworld, a firm that tracked sales in the United States, reported 49,036 units sold of Postal by December 2002.

Next Generation reviewed the PC version of the game, rating it four stars out of five, and stated that "Overall, Postal is a title that breaks absolutely no new ground, but its tongue-in-cheek shooting action comes together to form a well-above-average shooter that adds to the genre."

Postal received mixed reviews from critics. It holds a Metacritic score of 56/100. GameSpot's Mark East gave the game a 6.6/10 score and commented: "The lack of longevity in the single-player mode and the simplistic multiplayer options make Postal a moderately fun ride, at best." On regards to The Postal Dude's aggressive personality East comments on the Postal Dude's phrases from his diary, which indicate "something's not quite right in Postal Dude's noggin". 

In a retrospective, GamingOnLinux reviewer Hamish Paul Wilson gave the game 7/10, commenting that "there is no denying that Postal has some faults even when compared to some of the other games that were released around the same time as it, and time has definitely not been very kind to the title itself. But the concepts that the game explores, the ideas being expressed, and much of their actual implementations are just so interesting and compelling that one can still actually look past many of these faults and see the hidden gem that lies underneath."

The reviewer from Pyramid #30 (March/April 1998) stated that "Many people have thought the premise for the game is sick. Well, it is. But, that's what makes it fun. There's no quest for secret, lost treasure. There's no time-clock ticking away as you try desperately to save the world. There's no alien spaceships or fantastical powers. There's just good old fashioned, psychotic violence - something that our mass media entertainment powers have been bringing us on prime time for years."

Sequels 
A sequel to the game, Postal 2, was released in 2003. Director Uwe Boll bought the movie rights for the series and produced a film of the same name. Two additional sequels, Postal III and Postal 4: No Regerts, were released in 2011 and 2022, respectively.

Redux 
Running with Scissors developed a remake of Postal, titled Postal Redux, using Unreal Engine 4. The project was announced as Postal: Redux in November 2014, then targeting a 2015 release for Linux, macOS, and Microsoft Windows. In addition to these platforms, Running with Scissors announced Postal Redux as coming to PlayStation 4 in February 2016. The Microsoft Windows version was released on May 20, 2016, while Linux, macOS, and PlayStation 4 versions were scheduled for a later release. The PlayStation 4 version was canceled by June 2017, with Jaret Schachter of Running with Scissors blaming a lack of sales of the PC version. MD Games ported Postal Redux to the Nintendo Switch, releasing it via the Nintendo eShop on October 16, 2020. The company also produced a PlayStation 4 version, which was released on March 5, 2021.

References

External links 

 
 
 POSTAL 1 Open Source

1997 video games
Android (operating system) games
Classic Mac OS games
Commercial video games with freely available source code
Dreamcast games
Freeware games
Horror video games
Linux games
Loki Entertainment games
MacOS games
Mass murder in fiction
Multiplayer and single-player video games
Nintendo Switch games
Obscenity controversies in video games
Open-source video games
PlayStation 4 games
Postal (franchise)
Ripcord Games games
Run and gun games
Satirical video games
Video games developed in the United States
Video games with expansion packs
Video games with isometric graphics
Windows games